The Archdeacon of Connor is a senior ecclesiastical officer within the Diocese of Connor.

The archdeaconry can trace its history from Eustacius, the first known incumbent, who went on to be Bishop of the Diocese to the current incumbent Stephen McBride. McBride  is responsible for the disciplinary supervision of the Connor clergy; and the upkeep of diocesan property.

References

 
Lists of Anglican archdeacons in Ireland
Diocese of Connor
Religion in County Antrim
Diocese of Connor (Church of Ireland)